Highway  is a Montenegrin band. They participated in the second series of X Factor Adria in 2015, and ended in fourth place. The band consists of lead singer Petar Tošić, guitarists and back-up singers Marko Pešić and Luka Vojvodić.

They represented Montenegro at the Eurovision Song Contest 2016 in Stockholm. with "The Real Thing". They performed on May 10, 2016 during the first semi-final of the contest, but failed to qualify to the May 14 final.

References

Eurovision Song Contest entrants for Montenegro
Eurovision Song Contest entrants of 2016
Montenegrin musical groups
Musical groups established in 2015
2015 establishments in Montenegro
The X Factor contestants